Black Cinderella Two Goes East (sometimes referred to as Black Cinderella II Goes East) was a radio pantomime broadcast on BBC Radio 2 on 25 December 1978. The programme is notable for being one of only a few radio programmes (co)-produced by Douglas Adams while he was employed by the BBC as a radio producer, also for giving a significant role to a serving politician, John Pardoe. The hour-long programme was written by Clive Anderson and Rory McGrath and was co-produced by Douglas Adams and John Lloyd.

The programme featured performances by:

Richard Baker, Narrator
Tim Brooke-Taylor, Timothenia and the King
Rob Buckman, Prince Charming
John Cleese, Fairy Godperson
Peter Cook, Prince Disgusting
Graeme Garden, Gardenia and Manny
David Hatch, himself
Maggie Henderson, Cinderella
Jo Kendall, Wicked Stepmother and Princess Sally
Richard Murdoch, Baron Ofbeef
Bill Oddie, himself, Town Crier and Talking Horse 
John Pardoe MP, Fairy-tale Liberal Prime Minister

Douglas Adams had to follow the show's writers to Cambridge in order to get them to work on the script, and had to pick up the finished script from a messenger on a train. Adams also recorded a reluctant John Cleese at home. Cleese had vowed never to work for BBC Radio again, following a dispute over a sketch in the series John Cleese's Sketchbook. Cleese's lines were then played from a tape recorder into the broadcast programme.

References
Douglas Adams at the BBC - Three Compact Disc set 
BBC Radio 7 Tribute to Douglas Adams - Transmitted on 2 March 2003
Don't Panic: The Official Hitchhiker's Guide to the Galaxy Companion by Neil Gaiman

BBC Radio comedy programmes
BBC Radio 2 programmes